The 1st Guards Kirovograd-Berlin Red Banner Order of Suvorov and Kutzov Assault Aviation Corps (1st Gv shak) was a military formation of the Red Air Force during the Second World War, and of the Soviet Air Force until 1949. It was then renamed the 60th Guards Assault Aviation Corps, and was active until its disbandment in 1956. Its primary aircraft was the Ilyushin Il-2 'Sturmovik'.

Designations 
 1st Assault Aviation Corps
 1st Kirovograd Assault Aviation Corps (1942–44)
 1st Guards Kirovograd Assault Aviation Corps
 1st Guards Kirovograd-Berlin Red Banner Orders of Suvorov and Kutuzov Assault Aviation Corps (1944–49)
 60th Guards Assault Aviation Corps (1949–56)

Formation 
The 1st Assault Aviation Corps was formed by an NKO Order dated September 10, 1942, from the 2nd Fighter Aviation Army.
Part of the order establishing the corps said:
1. Establish and keep in the Reserve of the Supreme High Command: 
b) 1st Assault Aviation Corps as part: Office of the Air shtat No. 015/281, 121st Communications Battalion Shtat 015/215, 292nd, 290th and 266th Assault Aviation Divisions, each composed of three assault and one fighter aviation regiments with 32 aircraft each. 
1st Assault Aviation Corps stationed in Yurkino district, Dmitrov. 
3. Three squadrons are part of each of the fighter and assault aviation regiments, consisting of two flights with four aircraft and two aircraft for the squadron commander and commissar. The regimental headquarters have two aircraft for the use of the regimental commander and commissar. 

4. 1st and 2nd Fighter and the 1st Bomber Air Army - disband. Personnel and equipment used to staff the [new] air corps. 
5. Air Corps to be included as part of the army .... 
11. Assign the following to the corps: as the commander of the 1st Assault Aviation Corps, Major General of Aviation Vasily Georgyevich Ryazanov, as the commander of the 290th Assault Aviation Division Lieutenant Colonel P.I. Mironenko, as the commander of the 263rd Bomber Aviation Division Colonel F.I. Dobysh, as the commander of the 266th Assault Aviation Division Lieutenant Colonel F.G. Radyakina

World War II 

In the Battle of Kursk (Operation Citadel), General Vasily Ryazanov became a master in the use of attack aircraft en masse, developing and improving the tactics of Il-2 operations in co-ordination with infantry, artillery and armored troops. Il-2s at Kursk used the "circle of death" tactic: up to eight Sturmoviks formed a defensive circle, each plane protecting the one ahead with its forward machine guns, while individual Il-2s took turns leaving the circle, attacking a target, and rejoining the circle. Ryazanov was later awarded the Gold Star of Hero of Soviet Union twice, and the 1st Assault Aircraft Corps under his command became the first unit to be awarded the honorific title of Guards. In 1943, one loss corresponded to 26 Sturmovik sorties. About half of those lost were shot down by fighters, the rest falling to anti-aircraft fire.

Part of the 'Operational Army' 
The 1st Assault Aviation Corps was part of the 'operational army' (in combat) from October 17, 1942 to February 5, 1944, a period of 477 days. The corps was still part of the 'operational army' after its elevation to Guards status and remained in combat until 11 May 1945. The corps thus spent 937 days in combat.

Notes

References 
 

Units and formations of the Soviet Air Forces
Air units and formations of the Soviet Union in World War II
Corps of the Soviet Union in World War II
Military units and formations disestablished in 1949